Claudie Flament (21 April 1930 – 9 February 2016) was a French hurdler. She competed in the women's 80 metres hurdles at the 1952 Summer Olympics.

References

1930 births
2016 deaths
Athletes (track and field) at the 1952 Summer Olympics
French female hurdlers
Olympic athletes of France
Place of birth missing